Nowra  is a city in the South Coast region of New South Wales, Australia. As of the 2021 census, Nowra has an estimated population of 22,584. Situated in the southern reaches of the Sydney basin, Nowra is the seat and commercial centre of the City of Shoalhaven.

The region around Nowra is a farming community with a thriving dairy industry and a significant amount of state-owned forest land. It is also an increasingly popular retirement and leisure area for people from Canberra and Sydney.

History

Prior to European arrival, the part of the Nowra region south of the Shoalhaven river was inhabited by the Wandi-Wandandian tribe of the Yuin nation, while the region north of Shoalhaven was inhabited by the Dharawal people.  The name Nowra, originally written by Europeans as 'nou-woo-ro' (pronounced Nowa Nowa by the Indigenous Australians of the area), is an Aboriginal word for the black cockatoo.

Circa 1824, ex-convict Mary Reibey applied for a land grant in the Burrier area, on the southern side of the Shoalhaven River. The Nowra township was officially recognized in 1852. Less than ten years later, in 1861, a postal service was established. In 1861 the racehorse Archer, which was trained in Nowra by Etienne de Mestre, won the first Melbourne Cup. Nowra was declared a town in 1885 and a city in 1979.

A major landmark in the area is the house Bundanon, which renowned Australian artist Arthur Boyd and his wife Yvonne donated to the people of Australia in 1993 along with an adjoining property that had been previously owned by Boyd's brother-in-law, the equally famous Australian artist Sidney Nolan. Bundanon began as a single-storey weatherboard structure built around 1840. In 1866, a two-storey sandstone house, made of locally quarried stone, was built immediately in front of the original weatherboard house. The sandstone house features timber verandas and is now listed on the Register of the National Estate.

Heritage listings 
Nowra has a number of heritage-listed sites, including:
 Pleasant Way: Graham Lodge
 35 West Street: Meroogal

Geography
Along the north of Nowra is the Shoalhaven River, which formerly hosted the Australian National wakeboarding championships and is a popular fishing location. The Nowra Bridge connects it to North Nowra and Bomaderry. The Shoalhaven River is a saltwater river, although it does not flow into the sea. The Shoalhaven River meets the sea through the canal that joins the Shoalhaven and Crookhaven Rivers, which was dug by convicts under the direction of local entrepreneur and pioneer Alexander Berry.

Climate 
Nowra has a humid subtropical climate (Cfa) under the Köppen climate classification. This makes it the southernmost city on the coastal strip to be within this climate zone. Interestingly, nearby coastal cities to the north, such as Wollongong and Kiama, are not in this zone and instead have an oceanic climate (Cfb) because their warmest month's average temperature do not reach the 22 °C threshold. Due to its position on the leeward side of the Great Dividing Range, Nowra experiences a foehn effect, particularly in late winter and spring.

Demographics 
According to the 2021 census, Nowra has a population of 22,584. This covers suburbs only south of the Shoalhaven River. The population is slightly younger than the state and country as a whole, with an average age of 37 compared to 38 for both Australia and New South Wales. However, the population is bimodally distributed, with a larger percentage of children and the elderly than the state and national averages. 79.7% of the population were born in Australia and 82.1% speak only English at home, both above the state and national averages.

Nowra has a lower level of tertiary education than typical for the state and nation. Only 15% of the population of Nowra hold a tertiary qualification, compared to 23.3% of Australia and 23.8% of New South Wales.

The top five reported ancestries in Nowra at the 2021 census were Australian (40.9%), English (37.7%), Australian Aboriginal (10%), Irish (9.5%), and Scottish (8.3%). Most (63%) people had both parents born in Australia, higher than the state and national averages.

The population of the suburb of Nowra (central Nowra) at the 2021 census was 9,956. The Australian Bureau of statistics also recognises a larger built-up area including suburbs north of the Shoalhaven, North Nowra-Bomaderry, which had a population of 16,098 at the 2021 census.

Economy
Nowra Town Hall was built in 1948 and is in the Central Business District. This district contains many services, including banks, health services and a library.

Nowra has a growing tourist industry, especially in the summer months, when visitors (mostly from Sydney and Canberra) flock to the beaches to enjoy swimming, surfing, fishing, shopping, and relaxing in the restaurants and cafés.

Nowra sits in the Shoalhaven region, where there are several vineyards producing award-winning wines.

Education
Nowra has three public high schools: Nowra High School, Shoalhaven High School and Bomaderry High School. There are also several non-government schools, all of which are religiously affiliated:

 Nowra Christian School: a K-12 Christian-based school located in South Nowra
 Nowra Anglican College: a K-12 Anglican college in Bomaderry
 St John the Evangelist Catholic High School: a Catholic systemic high school on the outskirts of Nowra, affiliated with St Michael's Catholic Primary School in Nowra

There are seven public primary schools in the Nowra area: East Nowra Public School, Nowra Public School, Bomaderry Public School, Illaroo Road Public School, North Nowra Public School, Nowra Hill Public School, and Terara Public School.

The University of Wollongong has a campus in Nowra, and there is a campus of TAFE NSW Illawarra Institute in Bomaderry.

Health
There are two hospitals in Nowra: the Shoalhaven District Memorial Hospital, which is a hub for oncology services, and Nowra Private Hospital.

Sports 

The four major codes of football in Australia are all popular in the Nowra area. Rugby union is represented by the Shoalhaven Rugby Club, who play out of Rugby Park in South Nowra. The club won the 2008 premiership in the Illawarra district competition, and has produced international and provincial players such as Andrew Walker and Alex Kanaar.  Australian rules football is played by three clubs from the Shoalhaven area, with the Nowra Albatross Vikings playing at West Street Oval and the Bomaderry Tigers at Artie Smith Oval. Further south, the Bay and Basin Bombers play at the Leisure Centre at Vincentia. These four clubs are all members of the South Coast AFL, fielding junior and senior teams.  Rugby league was traditionally represented by the Nowra Warriors and Bomaderry Swamprats. However, at the end of 2007 these teams merged to form the Shoalhaven Jets Rugby League Football Club.

The Shoalhaven Mariners were established in 2006 and represent the area in the sport of baseball. The team plays home matches out of Fred Finch Park in Berkeley, Wollongong. Baseball has a new venue at the South Nowra Soccer Complex. The Shoalhaven Tigers represent the area in the New South Wales State Basketball League and have won several championships from 1988 until 2007.

Archer was an Australian thoroughbred racehorse trained in the Nowra area who won the first and the second Melbourne Cups in 1861 and 1862. He won both Cups by a significant margin. Archer is one of only five horses to have won the Melbourne Cup on two or more occasions, and one of only four horses to have won two successive Cups.

Public transport 

Nowra Coaches operates services from Nowra to Bomaderry, Huskisson, Vincentia and Jervis Bay. Shoal Bus operates services from Nowra to Berry, Gerringong and Sussex Inlet. Premier Motor Service operates express services along the Princes Highway from Sydney to Eden that call at Nowra.

Nowra has no direct rail connection, but the Illawarra railway line terminates at nearby Bomaderry railway station with NSW TrainLink operating services to Kiama and Sydney.

Notable people

 Arthur Boyd, artist
 Tony Branson, Australian rugby league international
 Deborah Cheetham, Indigenous Australian opera singer.
 Ian Davis, Australian cricket international
 Jeff Dowdell, basketball (Cairns Taipans) player
 Adam Federici, football (soccer) player
 Christie Hayes, actress
 Blake Horton, football (soccer) player
 William Kamm, also known as 'Little Pebble', disgraced religious leader
 Nic Maddinson, cricketer
 Bruce McGuire, Australian rugby league international & NSW State of Origin player
 Frank Moorhouse, writer
 Michael O'Connor, dual international rugby league & union player
 Ashley Paske, actor. Appeared in Neighbours (1989–1991).
 Karen Phillips, swimmer
 Rodney Rude, comedian
 Arron Spiessberger-Parker, 1500m runner 
 Jim Stanbury, World Professional Sculling Champion 1891–1896 and 1905–1906.
 Rohan Taylor, national swimming coach
 Corey Tutt, founder of DeadlyScience
 Andrew Walker, dual international rugby league & union player

Attractions
 Shoalhaven Regional Gallery
Fleet Air Arm Museum

References

External links

Shoalhaven City Council
VISITNSW.com – Nowra

 
City of Shoalhaven
Towns in New South Wales
Towns in the South Coast (New South Wales)
Populated places established in 1852
1852 establishments in Australia